Plastow Green is a hamlet in north Hampshire, England.

Governance
The hamlet is part of the civil parish of Ashford Hill with Headley, and is part of the Kingsclere ward of Basingstoke and Deane borough council. The borough council is a Non-metropolitan district of Hampshire County Council.

References

External links

Villages in Hampshire